Edward Miller (February 17, 1916 – November 9, 2000) was an American football quarterback in the National Football League. He played for the New York Giants. He played college football for the New Mexico State Aggies.

References

1916 births
2000 deaths
American football quarterbacks
New York Giants players
New Mexico State Aggies football players
Sportspeople from Muskogee, Oklahoma